The 1980 Pittsburgh Panthers football team represented the University of Pittsburgh as an independent during the 1980 NCAA Division I-A football season. Despite losing one game, the Panthers were named national champion by NCAA-designated major selectors DeVold System, Football Research, and The New York Times, while also named co-national champion by Rothman (FACT) and Sagarin. The university does not claim a national championship for this season, nor are the Panthers popularly recognized for winning that year's national championship.   Pitt was awarded the Lambert-Meadowlands Trophy as the champion of the East.

The team is noteworthy for featuring four future members of the Pro Football Hall of Fame:  Linebacker Rickey Jackson, Center Russ Grimm, Tackle Jimbo Covert, and quarterback Dan Marino.  Several other players on the team, including Mark May and Hugh Green, would go on to be Pro Bowl NFL stars.

Championship selections
Selectors that named Pitt the 1980 national champion:
1st-N-Goal
Angelo Louisa
ARGH Power Ratings
College Football Researchers Association
Foundation for the Analysis of Competitions and Tournaments
Harry DeVold
James Howell
Jeff Self
The New York Times
Quality Champions
Sagarin Ratings
Steve Eck
The Fleming System

Schedule

Roster

Coaching staff

Season summary

Boston College

at Kansas

Temple

Maryland

at #11 Florida State

West Virginia

Starting free safety Rick Trocano moved over to offense in the second quarter to replace the injured Dan Marino. Previously the starter at QB in 1978, Trocano led Pitt to four second-quarter touchdowns during the Panthers' win at Pitt Stadium.

at Tennessee

at Syracuse

Louisville

at Army

at #5 Penn State

vs. #18 South Carolina (Gator Bowl)

Team players drafted into the NFL

Awards and honors 
Hugh Green, Walter Camp Award
Hugh Green, Lombardi Award
Hugh Green, Maxwell Award
Mark May, Outland Trophy

Media

Radio

References

Pittsburgh
Pittsburgh Panthers football seasons
Gator Bowl champion seasons
Lambert-Meadowlands Trophy seasons
Pittsburgh Panthers football
1980s in Pittsburgh